Noengrothai Chaipetch (RTGS: Nueng-rue-thai Chaipet, born 1 December 1982) is a female high jumper from Thailand. Her personal best jump is 1.94 metres, achieved in December 2009 in Vientiane, Laos.

She won the bronze medal at the 2003 Asian Championships. She also competed at the 2004 and 2008 Summer Olympics without reaching the final.

International competitions

References

1982 births
Living people
Noengrothai Chaipetch
Athletes (track and field) at the 2004 Summer Olympics
Athletes (track and field) at the 2008 Summer Olympics
Noengrothai Chaipetch
Athletes (track and field) at the 2006 Asian Games
Athletes (track and field) at the 2010 Asian Games
Noengrothai Chaipetch
Southeast Asian Games medalists in athletics
Noengrothai Chaipetch
Noengrothai Chaipetch
Noengrothai Chaipetch
Competitors at the 2005 Southeast Asian Games
Competitors at the 2007 Southeast Asian Games
Competitors at the 2009 Southeast Asian Games
Noengrothai Chaipetch
Noengrothai Chaipetch
Noengrothai Chaipetch